The Diocese of Mpwapwa is a central diocese in the Anglican Church of Tanzania: its current bishop is the Most Reverend Jacob Chimeledya.

Notes

Anglican Church of Tanzania dioceses
 
Morogoro
Anglican realignment dioceses